Stephania cephalantha is a plant in the genus Stephania of the family Menispermaceae native to China, Taiwan and Vietnam.

References

cephalantha
Plants described in 1913